Guaviraví is a populated place in Corrientes Province, Argentina.

External links
http://www.tutiempo.net/Tierra/Argentina/Guaviravi-AR018272.html

Populated places in Corrientes Province